Emily Warren Schwartz (born August 25, 1992) is an American singer and songwriter signed to the label Prescription Songs. She is best known for the songs she has written for several high-profile pop artists, including The Chainsmokers, Dua Lipa, Shawn Mendes, David Guetta, Khalid, Sigrid, and Zedd. She received a nomination for the Grammy Award for Song of the Year for co-writing Dua Lipa's "Don't Start Now".

Early life and education 
Warren was brought up on the Upper West Side of Manhattan, New York City, where she attended the preparatory school Trinity, from kindergarten through high school. From an early age, she had a penchant for the creative and performed regularly with her band, Emily Warren & the Betters (members Etienne Bowler and Marc Campbell went on to form part of the pop band MisterWives). A single from The Betters EP, Not at All, was featured on the soundtrack of MTV's short-lived series, Skins. She was accepted into the NYU Tisch School/Clive Davis Institute in 2011 and offered a songwriter's contract with Prescription (Rx) Songs in 2013. In 2015 Warren graduated from the university and began splitting her time between Los Angeles and London. She currently resides in Wilson, Wyoming and Los Angeles, California.

Music career

Beginnings 
After signing with Dr. Luke, Warren disbanded the Betters and spent a year in LA. Soon after her arrival, she co-wrote "Masterpiece", the third single on pop artist Jessie J's album, Sweet Talker. "Masterpiece" debuted at number 30 on the US Mainstream Top 40 and number 65 on the Billboard Hot 100, it was also certified gold in Australia and New Zealand. Following the success of that release, Warren eventually teamed up with longtime friend and collaborator Scott Harris to co-write four songs from Shawn Mendes' platinum-selling album, Handwritten: "Strings", "Aftertaste", "Air" and "Lost". September 18, 2015, marked the release of The Chainsmokers' and Tritonal's "Until You Were Gone", which featured Warren's lead vocals. Her performance was immediately praised by Nylon, which wrote: "Her delivery is filled with a longing that packs a strong punch." Additionally, The Chainsmokers hailed Warren as "one of the best songwriters and vocalists that they had ever worked with". Shortly after, Warren teamed up again with Scott Harris and together they wrote "Don't Let Me Down" with The Chainsmokers, which reached number 3 and went on to reach triple platinum in the United States. It was both The Chainsmokers and Daya's first top 5 on the Billboard Hot 100. "Don't Let Me Down" was also nominated and won a Grammy in 2017 for Best Dance Recording. Around the same time, Warren co-wrote and featured vocals on viral hit "Capsize" with Los Angeles duo Frenship, which is certified platinum and has surpassed 400 million streams on Spotify (115 million of which were acquired prior to its radio impact date).

When interviewed by the online music publication Smashed about her writing process, Warren stated: "I think that sometimes songwriting, especially for pop, is viewed as a factory or an assembly line process, and I have to challenge that... I think that good songwriting has a real art to it, and I don't just mean the profound or thought-provoking ones. Even most of the light-hearted, straight-up pop ones are masterfully written–sometimes even harder to write." Warren's express mission as a writer and artist is to create pop music that has the conceptual backing to influence positive social change. In a Tisch interview, she states: "What excites me about this field is that pop music can be an incredibly powerful and crucial platform for influence and change." She also has uncredited vocals on The Chainsmokers' track "Paris" from their debut album Memories... Do Not Open. She quotes "I think for the first song introducing their album, they just wanted it to be a Chainsmokers thing and not featuring anyone." The Chainsmokers felt it would be best to release it as a single without any features because it would promote their new album. Although she did not receive credit for the vocals she believed it all worked out and quotes: "It ended up kinda working out for the best 'cause there was all this mystery of who was singing it!". In 2019 Emily, along with her collaborators Ian Kirkpatrick (record producer) and Caroline Ailin wrote the hit Dua Lipa song Don't Start Now.

Artist 
Warren's beginnings as an artist came with the release of American pop duo Frenship's single, "Capsize". Warren not only co-wrote the viral hit, but also performed as a featured vocalist. She made her first televised appearance performing "Capsize" with the duo on Jimmy Kimmel Live! on December 8, 2016.

On April 7, 2017, American electronic pop duo The Chainsmokers released their debut album, Memories...Do Not Open. Warren was credited as a writer on four songs, including "The One", "Don't Say", "My Type" and "Wake Up Alone". She was additionally featured as lead vocalist on "Don't Say" and "My Type" and provided uncredited backup vocals on "Paris". She was announced as a special guest on the duo's American "Memories...Do Not Open" tour and appeared with them for a performance of "Paris" on the April 8, 2017, episode of Saturday Night Live. The album debuted at #1 on the Billboard 200 Chart.

On May 5, 2017, Warren released her debut single, "Hurt By You", which landed on both the US Viral and Global Viral charts on Spotify. On July 21, 2017, Warren released her second single, "Something To Hold On To", which was also featured on Spotify's New Music Friday playlist. Her most recent single, "Poking Holes", was released on October 12, 2017.

On November 14, 2017, Warren was named as one of the Forbes 30 under 30 in the music industry. The list, according to Forbes, is an "annual encyclopedia of creative disruption featuring 600 stars from 20 different industries." Skylar Grey, one of the judges on the panel that selected Warren, said she was selected in part because, "Her sound and style of writing is so fresh, and I find a lot of other writers trying to emulate it. She's young, but she's been in the game for a while, so this isn't some flash-in-the-pan writer. I think she'll be killing it for a long time."

Discography

Songwriting credits

Studio albums

Singles

As lead artist

As featured artist

Other charted songs

References 

Other sources
 
 
 

1992 births
Living people
American women pop singers
American women singer-songwriters
21st-century American women singers
21st-century American singers
American singer-songwriters
Albums produced by Mac & Phil